Udhampur (ˌʊd̪ʱəmpur) is a city and a municipal council in Udhampur district in the Indian union territory of  Jammu and Kashmir. It is the headquarters of Udhampur District. Named after Raja Udham Singh, it serves as the district capital and the Northern Command headquarters of the Indian Army. A Forward Base Support Unit (FBSU) of the Indian Air Force is also stationed here. Udhampur is used by the Armed Forces as a transit point between Jammu and Srinagar when travelling by road on National Highway 1A, which has since been renamed as National Highway 44.

Geography
The district of Udhampur is located in the Shivalik range of Himalayas and the terrain is mostly mountainous. The upper reaches of the district experience snowfall in the winter season. The city itself is in a relatively flatter part of the district at an elevation of 756 metres (2480 feet) and it rarely experiences any snowfall.

Administration
The town of Udhampur is governed by Udhampur Municipal Committee with 22 municipal wards.

Notable Personalities
Romalo Ram Dogri: Artist
Sars Bharti: Musician
Surinder Singh Khalsa

Climate
The city's climate is subtropical. Summer temperatures may exceed 40 degrees while temperatures below freezing have been recorded in winter. The annual rainfall is 130 cm, mainly in monsoons and winters. Central Udhampur rarely experiences snowfall, though its outer regions do occasionally. Due to changing climate patterns, heavier snowfall has been experienced in recent years. In 2011, there was about 15 cm snow. Heavy hailstorms with piles of hail can be experienced in February and March.

Demographics

According to the 2011 Indian census,   Udhampur urban area has a population of  91,366, of which 35,507 live in the Udhampur Municipal Council area, 48,508 live in Udhampur's out-growths, and 5,743 live in Rehambal. Males constitute 60.2% of the population and females 39.8%. The large male percentage is due to the army constituting a large part of the city's population. Udhampur has an average literacy rate of 91.5%. 
The dominant religion in the city is Hinduism.

Transport

Road

Udhampur is located on National Highway NH-44, which is the only national highway that connects Srinagar to the rest of India. Bus services (both private and state owned) are the most common mode of public transportation to and from Udhampur. Frequent connections to the Kashmir Valley and Jammu are available. Taxi services are also available for going to Jammu and Srinagar and other nearby towns, and minibuses operate within the city.

Rail

Udhampur is connected to Jammu which is the winter capital of UT Jammu and Kashmir in India. The Uttar Sampark Kranti Express train from New Delhi was the first train to run on this link in 2005. More than a dozen long-distance trains either originate from Udhampur railway station or connect Udhampur to the rest of India. Commuter unreserved passenger trains link Jammu and Udhampur.

The project to connect Udhampur to the Kashmir valley by railway track is progressing. The railway line has been laid to Katra. Now Katra to Banihal track remains to be laid to complete the Jammu–Baramulla line.

The Northern Railway Construction Organization (Jammu–Baramulla line) is working on connecting Udhampur and Srinagar.

Air 

Udhampur Air Force Station of the Indian Air Force (IAF) is located in Udhampur but it is not open for civilians. Jammu Airport is the nearest civilian airport.

Gallery

See also
Udhampur-Jammu highway

References

16. Pingla Mata Shrine — Pingla Mata Cave is situated in Village Pinger of Ramnagar Tehsil in Udhampur District.

External links
 Udhampur Government Website
 Vaishno Devi Shrine
 Udhampur District
Being Dogra

 
Cities and towns in Udhampur district
Himalayas
Cities in Jammu and Kashmir